Stelton may refer to:

Stelton, New Jersey
Stelton Baptist Church, Edison
Stelton station, now called Edison (NJT station)